Rejnaldo Troplini (born 9 November 1994 in Durrës) is an Albanian football player who currently plays for Erzeni Shijak in the Albanian Second Division. His main position is on the right side of the midfield, but he is also capable of playing as a right back.

References

1994 births
Living people
Footballers from Durrës
Albanian footballers
Association football midfielders
Association football defenders
KF Teuta Durrës players
KF Laçi players
KF Erzeni players
Kategoria Superiore players
Kategoria e Dytë players
Kategoria e Parë players